Samir Šarić (born 27 May 1984 in Sarajevo) is a Bosnian-Herzegovinian retired football player.

Club career
He has played for Radnik Hadžići, FK Sarajevo, Umeå FC, Løv-Ham and Sandefjord.

Career statistics

External links
 Profile at SandefjordFotball.no

1984 births
Living people
Footballers from Sarajevo
Association football forwards
Bosnia and Herzegovina footballers
FK Sarajevo players
Umeå FC players
Løv-Ham Fotball players
Sandefjord Fotball players
Premier League of Bosnia and Herzegovina players
Eliteserien players
Norwegian First Division players
Bosnia and Herzegovina expatriate footballers
Expatriate footballers in Sweden
Bosnia and Herzegovina expatriate sportspeople in Sweden
Expatriate footballers in Norway
Bosnia and Herzegovina expatriate sportspeople in Norway